Mouton-Duvernet is a Paris Métro station on line 4 in Paris' 14th arrondissement.

Location
The station is located on Avenue du Général-Leclerc at Rue Mouton-Duvernet.

History
The line 4 platforms were opened on 30 October 1909 when the southern section of the line opened between Raspail and Porte d'Orléans. The name refers to the Rue Mouton-Duvernet, named after 19th-century general Régis Barthélemy Mouton-Duvernet.

The station was renovated in early 1969 with a new design based on the orange tile, which was nicknamed the Mouton design. Twenty other stations are transformed on the same model during the following years. But it has lost the orange design since 13 March 13, 2007, following its renovation as part of the Renouveau du métro program, as at the Gare de l'Est station on Lines 5 and 7.

The station is now fitted with a set of platform screen doors, due to the RATP working to automate the line 4. The installation start in June 2018 and the installation ended in August 2018.

In 2018, 1,645,671 travelers entered this station which places it at 275th position of metro stations for its usage.

Passenger services

Access
The station has two entrances in front of nos 36 and 40-42 on Avenue du Général-Leclerc. One of them has a Guimard entrance.

Station layout

Platform
Mouton-Duvernet is a standard configuration station: it has two platforms separated by metro tracks and the roof is elliptical.

Bus connections
The station is served by Lines 38 and 68 of the RATP Bus Network and, at night, by lines N14 and N21 of the Noctilien bus network.

Gallery

References

Roland, Gérard (2003). Stations de métro. D’Abbesses à Wagram. Éditions Bonneton.

Paris Métro stations in the 14th arrondissement of Paris
Railway stations in France opened in 1909